The New Orleans Breakers are a professional American football team based in New Orleans, Louisiana. The Breakers compete in the United States Football League (USFL) as a member of the league's South division. Since 2022, the team plays its home games at Protective Stadium in Birmingham, Alabama, which also hosts the University of Alabama at Birmingham Blazers.

History 
The New Orleans Breakers were one of eight teams that were officially announced as a USFL franchise on The Herd with Colin Cowherd on November 22, 2021.

On January 27, 2022, it was announced on The Herd with Colin Cowherd that former NCAA Head coach Larry Fedora was named the Head coach and General manager of the Breakers. Fedora would go on to lead the Breakers to a 6–4 regular season record, clinching a playoff spot following their Week 9 victory over Tampa Bay Bandits. The Breakers would lose in the divisional championship game to the Birmingham Stallions 17–31. Following the season, Fedora stepped down as the head coach of the Breakers, citing wanting to spend more time with his family.

On November 10, 2022, the Breakers announced that they had named John DeFilippo as their second head coach.

Personnel

Current roster 
Initially, each team carried a 38-man active roster and a 7-man practice squad, but the rosters were increased to 40 active players and 50 total in May, 2022.

Staff

Statistics and records

Season-by-season record

Note: The Finish, Wins, Losses, and Ties columns list regular season results and exclude any postseason play.

Records

References

2021 establishments in Alabama
American football teams established in 2021
New Orleans Breakers (2022)
American football teams in Birmingham, Alabama
United States Football League (2022) teams